Shubman Gill (born 8 September 1999) is an Indian international cricketer who plays for Punjab in domestic cricket as a right-handed opening batsman. He plays for Gujarat Titans in the Indian Premier League.
Notably, Gill served as the vice-captain of the Indian Under-19 cricket team in the 2018 Under-19 Cricket World Cup and received the prestigious Player of the Tournament award. He is considered as one of the most talented young cricketers in the world. Additionally, he holds the distinction of being the youngest cricketer to ever score a double century in One Day International cricket. He also has the record for highest score for the Indian men's T20I team.

He made his List-A debut against Vidharbha in 2017 and first-class debut for Punjab against Bengal in the 2017–18 Ranji Trophy, in late 2017, with a half-century in the game, and 129 runs in the LAST match against Services. He made his international debut for the Indian cricket team in January 2019.

He was drafted into India's Under-19 side as the vice-captain for the 2018 Under-19 Cricket World Cup. Shubman scored 372 runs at an average of 124.00 at the tournament, where he batted at number three to play a crucial role in India's record fourth world title and was adjudged the edition's Player of the Tournament. His match-winning 102 not out in the semi-final against arch-rivals Pakistan U-19 drew praises from batting greats such as Rahul Dravid, Sachin Tendulkar, VVS Laxman, and Sourav Ganguly.

Personal life
Shubman Gill's father Lakhwinder Singh was a farmer and Didar Singh Gill is his grandfather. He was born in 'Chak Khere wala (also  reported as Chak Jaimal Singh Wala)' village, which is near Jalalabad Tehsil in the Fazilka district of Punjab into a  Jat family. Shubman Gill has a sister named Shaheen Gill. His father Lakhwinder created a cricket ground in his farm for Gill's practice and a turf pitch to play, he used to challenge village boys to take his lad's wicket and if they were successful he would give them 100 rupees  for it. According to Lakhwinder Singh he left farming in his village and moved to Mohali to make his boy a professional cricketer. For some years Gill took coaching from his school, after his father admitted him in Punjab Cricket Association's academy.  Gill spent some years of his life in his village. Gill's father wanted to become a professional cricketer. In Gill's childhood he was interested in farming and he still wants to do farming according to his father. Shubman Gill is emotionally very attached to his village and his farm.

Early life
Shubman Gill was born in Fazilka, Punjab. His family owned agricultural lands there. His father, Lakhwinder Singh, an agriculturist, wanted to become a cricketer but could not fulfil his dream. Instead, he decided to make Gill a good cricketer. He observed his son's cricketing ability at an early age and welcomed the opportunity to modify his cricketing capacity. He would ask the hired help on the farm to throw balls at Shubman to help him practice batting. Gill's father was convinced of his talent, and moved the family to Mohali and rented a house near the PCA Stadium.

Gill's father said that Shubman was passionate about cricket since the age of three. “He only played cricket since he was three-years-old. Kids of that age would play with toys. He never asked for such things. It was only bat and ball for him. He used to sleep with a bat and ball”, Gill's father, Lakhwinder Singh said.

On his Under-16 state debut for Punjab, he hit an unbeaten double-century in the Vijay Merchant Trophy. In 2014, he scored 351 runs in Punjab's Inter-District Under-16 competition and shared a record opening stand of 587 runs with Nirmal Singh.

Domestic career
He made his List A debut for Punjab in the 2016–17 Vijay Hazare Trophy on 25 February 2017 against Vidharbha team. He made his first-class debut for Punjab in the 2017–18 Ranji Trophy on 17 November 2017. Later the same month, in his second first-class match, he scored his maiden century, batting for Punjab against Services. He scored 129 against Bengal team.

He made his Twenty20 debut for Kolkata Knight Riders in the 2018 Indian Premier League on 14 April 2018.

In October 2018, he was named in India C's squad for  the 2018–19 Deodhar Trophy. In the final round-robin match, against India A, he scored an unbeaten century to help send India C through to the final. The following month, he was named as one of eight players to watch ahead of the 2018–19 Ranji Trophy. In December 2018, during Punjab's match against Tamil Nadu in the Ranji Trophy, Gill scored his maiden double century in first-class cricket, scoring 268 runs. On 25 December 2018, on the fourth day of the match against Hyderabad in the Ranji Trophy, with Punjab needing 338 runs from 57 overs, Gill scored 148 off 154 balls to almost single-handedly take his side to victory. The match finished as a draw, with Punjab ending the run chase at 324/8 in 57 overs.

By 1 January 2019, Gill had scored 990 runs in first-class cricket, from fourteen innings across eight matches. One week later, he scored his 1,000th run in first-class cricket, in his fifteenth innings. He was the leading run-scorer for Punjab in the 2018–19 Ranji Trophy, with 728 runs in five matches. In March 2019, he was named as one of eight players to watch by the International Cricket Council (ICC) ahead of the 2019 Indian Premier League tournament. He also won the Emerging Player of the tournament award in the 2019 Indian Premier League.

In August 2019, he was named as the captain of the India Blue team for the 2019–20 Duleep Trophy. In October 2019, Gill was selected as the captain of the India C team for the 2019–20 Deodhar Trophy. In November 2019, he became the youngest cricketer to lead a side in the tournament. He was 20 years and 57 days old, beating Virat Kohli's record, when he was 21 years 124 days old, during the 2009–10 tournament.

In September 2022, Gill was signed up by Glamorgan as their overseas player for the remainder of the 2022 County Championship season. He debuted at Sophia ground against Worcestershire.

International career 
In February 2017, he was part of the Indian U-19 where he played a key role in the team's series win against England U-19,  In December 2017, he was named vice captain of India's squad for the 2018 Under-19 Cricket World Cup. He had a successful tournament, leading the team in runs scored with 372 runs and was also named the player of the tournament.  Following India's matches in the tournament, the International Cricket Council (ICC) named Gill as the rising star of the squad. 

In January 2019, Gill was added to India's squad for the limited-overs leg for their series against New Zealand. On 31 January 2019, he made his One Day International (ODI) debut for India, playing in the fourth ODI match of the series against New Zealand at Seddon Park, Hamilton. In August 2019, Gill set a record as the youngest Indian batsman to score a double century in a first-class match.  At the age of 19 years and 334 days, he scored 204 runs for India A against West Indies A at the Brian Lara Cricket Academy in Trinidad and Tobago. The following month, he was selected in India's Test squad for their series against South Africa, but did not play. In December 2019, Gill was named as the captain of India A squad for their tour of New Zealand. In February 2020, he was once again named in India's Test squad, this time for their series against New Zealand.

Gill made his Test debut for India on 26 December 2020, against Australia, helping India to a comeback win in the second match of the series. In the fourth Test at the Gabba, he scored 91 runs to help India win the series. His performances proved to be instrumental On 22 August 2022, Gill accomplished a major milestone in his cricket career by scoring his first One Day International (ODI) century for the Indian national team. The match was held in Harare, Zimbabwe, and was the third ODI of the series. On 16 December 2022, against Bangladesh, Gill scored the first century of his Test career and was dismissed for 110 runs.

Gill made his Twenty20 International debut on 3 January 2023, against Sri Lanka. He scored seven runs from five balls in that match. On 18 January 2023, against New Zealand, Gill scored a double century. He became 5th Indian batsman to hit a double century in ODI's, and he is currently the youngest batsman to score a double century in ODI's in men's international cricket .

On 1 February 2023, Gill scored his maiden T20I century against New Zealand. He became the 5th Indian batsman to score a century in all formats of international cricket. He now also holds the record of highest individual score by Indian in men's T20I, scoring 126 off 63.

References

External links
 

1999 births
Living people
Indian cricketers
India Test cricketers
India One Day International cricketers
Indian A cricketers
Kolkata Knight Riders cricketers
People from Fazilka district
Punjab, India cricketers
Gujarat Titans cricketers